Huw Higginson (born 21 February 1964) is an English actor, best known for playing PC George Garfield in The Bill from 1989 to 1999.

Higginson has also appeared in Heartbeat, EastEnders, Casualty, By Any Means and Jessica. He appeared as Mr Cunningham in two stories of The Sarah Jane Adventures entitled The Day of the Clown and The Mark of the Berserker.

After relocating to Australia in 2014, Higginson has appeared in numerous Australian television programmes and stage productions.

Some of the roles he has played since moving to Australia include General Birdwood in Deadline Gallipoli, Malcolm Hammill in Rake, Wayne Page in Janet King, Gus Reardon in Secret City and Dr. Samuels in A Place to Call Home.

On stage in Australia, Higginson has appeared in Love Letters, The House on the Lake and Tom Wells' The Kitchen Sink.

In 2016, Higginson adopted an Australian accent to play a commander in Meat and Livestock Australia's controversial "Operation Boomerang" We Love Lamb Australia Day commercial, part of the organisation's annual campaign to promote the consumption of lamb.

In 2017, it was announced Higginson would appear in Picnic at Hanging Rock, a six-part Foxtel television series produced by FremantleMedia Australia, adapted from Joan Lindsay's novel of the same name. 

In 2019 he appeared in a featured role in the Australian Broadcasting Corporation mini-series Total Control and in the film Top End Wedding. 

In 2021 he made appearances in Wentworth.

Personal life
Higginson is married to Hannah Waterman. They relocated to Australia with their son Jack in 2014.

Prior to his relationship with Waterman, Higginson was married to Geraldine Dove.

Higginson currently lives in the Sydney suburb of Balmain.

Higginson is the son of actors Tim Wylton and Ann Curthoys. Wylton was born Timothy Higginson and is best known for his roles in As Time Goes By and My Hero.

Notes

External links

English male soap opera actors
English people of Welsh descent
People from Hillingdon
1964 births
Living people
English emigrants to Australia